Darodi is a village in Parner taluka in Ahmednagar district in the state of Maharashtra, India.

Religion
The majority of the population in the village are Marathas.

Economy
The majority of the population has farming as their primary occupation. The majority of people are now situated at Mumbai or surrounding areas for job purposes.

See also
 Villages in Parner taluka

References 

Villages in Parner taluka
Villages in Ahmednagar district